The Shallotte River (pronounced shallOtte) is a tidal river in Brunswick County, North Carolina, United States. Waters drain from the tributaries of the Green Swamp near the town of Shallotte and flow south down the river to empty into the Atlantic Intracoastal Waterway.

Approximately one mile southwest of the river's mouth lies the Shallotte Inlet which connects the Intracostal Waterway to Long Bay of the Atlantic Ocean. The inlet separates Holden Beach Isle from Ocean Isle and was the actual mouth of the Shallotte River prior to the Intracoastal Waterway's construction and decades of shifting sands.

Name origin
The "Shallotte River" name dates back to at least 1734. According to some accounts, the waterway was once known as the "Charlotte River", a name coined by a traveler who crossed it by ferry. Over time the word Charlotte morphed into Shallotte. Another explanation is the river was so named on account of there being wild shallots along its course.

References

Rivers of Brunswick County, North Carolina
Rivers of North Carolina
Inlets of North Carolina